Heidi is a 1937 American musical drama film directed by Allan Dwan and written by Julien Josephson and Walter Ferris, loosely based on Johanna Spyri's 1880 children's book of the same name. The film stars Shirley Temple as the titular orphan, who is taken from her grandfather to live as a companion to Klara, a spoiled, disabled girl. It was a success and Temple enjoyed her third consecutive year as number one box office draw.

Plot
Adelheid, called Heidi (Shirley Temple), is an eight-year-old Swiss orphan who is given by her aunt Dete (Mady Christians) to her mountain-dwelling hermit grandfather, Adolph (Jean Hersholt). While Adolph behaves coolly toward her at first, her cheery nature turns him warm, and sees him open up to the nearby town.

Heidi is then stolen back by her aunt, to live in the wealthy Sesemann household in Frankfurt am Main as a companion to Klara (Marcia Mae Jones), a sheltered, disabled girl in a wheelchair who is constantly watched by the strict Fräulein Rottenmeier (Mary Nash). The local pastor runs into the aunt and Heidi before they leave and hears that Heidi is being taken to Frankurt, so he relays the information to her grandfather, who begins searching for her. Heidi is unhappy but makes the best of the situation, always longing for her grandfather.

Klara's doting father visits at Christmas and when Klara's shows him she can walk again, he offers Heidi a home, but she says she still wishes to go home to her grandfather. He refuses later telling Klara that Heidi's aunt explained Heidi's grandfather is a brutal man and she will be better off with them. Rottenmeier (who wants to keep Klara dependent upon her) is fired by Herr Sesemann when he sees her being cruel to Heidi and she tries to get rid of her by selling her to the gypsies, but she is stopped by Heidi's grandfather. She lies to the police who arrive, saying he has stolen her child. A pursuit takes place but Heidi explains he is her grandfather and Rottenmeier was trying to sell her to the gypsies. She tells the police that Herr Sesemann can verify her story and the next scene shows Heidi and her grandfather are reunited on the mountain, with Herr Sesemann and Klara visiting.

Cast
 Shirley Temple as Heidi, an 8-year-old orphan living with her hermitted grandfather in an Alpine hut. She is very happy, optimistic and adventurous.
 Jean Hersholt as Adolph Kramer, Heidi's grandfather who is grumpy at first but grows to care deeply for Heidi.
 Marcia Mae Jones as Klara Sesemann, a wealthy, disabled girl prone to tantrums. However, she shows kindness towards Heidi.
 Sidney Blackmer as Herr Sesemann, Klara's busy father who dotes on his daughter, wanting nothing but happiness for her.
 Thomas Beck as Schultz, the village pastor who tries to appeal to Adolph about Heidi's future.
 Arthur Treacher as Andrews, the butler of the Sesemann household who is always kind to Heidi.
 Mary Nash as Fräulein Rottenmeier, the no-nonsense châtelaine of the Sesemann household, who claims that her strictness is for Klara's well-being.
 Delmar Watson as Peter, Adolph's goatherd and a good friend of Heidi's.
 Mady Christians as Dete, Heidi's self-interested aunt who has taken care of her for six years prior to pushing her off on her grandfather.
 Helen Westley as Blind Anna, Peter's grandmother.
 Christian Rub as Baker
 Frank Reicher (uncredited) as Police lieutenant

Production
Midway through the shooting of the film, the dream sequence was added into the script. There were reports that Temple was behind the dream sequence and that she was enthusiastically pushing for it but in her autobiography she vehemently denied this. Her contract gave neither her nor her parents any creative control over the films she was in. While she enjoyed the opportunity to wear braids and to be lifted on high wire, she saw this as the collapse of any serious attempt by the studio to build upon the dramatic role from the previous film Wee Willie Winkie.

During the scene where Temple's character gets butted by the goat, she initially did the scene herself while completely padded up. After a few takes, however, her mother stepped in and insisted that a double be used. One of the extras, a boy, was dressed up to look like her. The boy's father was so upset over him doubling for a girl that he prohibited him from ever acting again. The double, who was not named, would later share diplomatic duties with Temple in Africa. Temple also had trouble milking the goat. To remedy this, Dwan had a flexible piece of tubing installed in such a way as to make it look as if the goat was being milked.

During the making of the film, director Dwan had new badges made for the Shirley Temple Police Force. This was an informal group thought up by Temple in 1935, which was, as she described "an organized system of obligations from whomever I was able to shanghai into membership." Every child wore one after swearing allegiance and obedience to 'Chief' Temple.  Everyone on the set was soon wearing badges with Temple strutting about giving orders to the crew such as "Take that set down and build me a castle." They went along with the game.

Temple made one other film in 1937, Wee Willie Winkie. The child actress was growing older and the studio was questioning how much longer she could keep playing "cute" roles when Heidi was filmed, but she retained her position as number one at the box office for the third year in a row.

Reception
Contemporary reviews were generally positive. Frank S. Nugent wrote that the film "contains all the harmless sweetness and pretty pictures one expects to find on the juvenile shelf," and found the supporting cast "quite up to Miss Temple's demanding standard." Variety gave the cast "more than a modicum of credit for making the picture what it is" and singled out Hersholt as "excellent." Harrison's Reports called it "a charming picture" that was "filled with human appeal." "Shirley Temple's latest picture is one of her best," reported Film Daily. "In every way, the picture is grand entertainment with its sweet sentiment, and its socko hilarity is ever a source of rollicking laughter." The Lewiston Evening Journal wrote that Temple had never been given "a more captivating role than that of Heidi," adding, "The story is of the old-fashioned type but we accept it uncritically with its improbabilities, its hectic race at the end, its tears, its laughter - it is so very human in its appeal." John Mosher of The New Yorker was less enthusiastic, writing, "There seems something rather musty and familiar about most of the predicaments in this movie."

The film is recognized by American Film Institute in these lists:
 2006: AFI's 100 Years...100 Cheers – Nominated

See also
 Shirley Temple filmography
 Heidi

References

Sources

External links
 
 
 
 

1937 films
American black-and-white films
Heidi films
Films directed by Allan Dwan
Films about orphans
Films set in Switzerland
Films set in the 1880s
20th Century Fox films
Films set in Frankfurt
American musical drama films
1930s musical drama films
Films about paraplegics or quadriplegics
1937 drama films
Films shot in California
1930s English-language films
1930s American films